Brandts Buys or Brandts Buijs is the surname of a dynasty of Dutch musicians:

 Cornelis Buys (1757–1831), father of Cornelis Alijander
 Cornelis Alijander Brandts Buys (1812–1890), father of Marius, Ludwig and Henri
 Marius Adrianus Brandts Buys (1840–1911), father of Marius Adrianus and Jan below
 Ludwig Felix (Willem Cornelis) Brandts Buys (1847–1917), father of Johann Sebastian
 Henri (François Robert) Brandts Buys (1850–1905),
 Johann Sebastian (1879–1939),
 Jan Willem Frans Brandts Buys (1868–1933),
 Marius Adrianus Brandts Buys (1874–1944), father of Hans
 Hans or Johann Sebastian Brandts Buys (1905–1959)
 Anna Brandts Buys-van Zijp, sculptor and co-author with Johann Sebastian (1879–1939) of a monograph on music in Madura

Sources

Musical families
Dutch-language surnames
Show business families of the Netherlands